Kenneth Porter Gatchell (September 3, 1901 – June 29, 1972) was a college basketball player and coach. He was twice an All-Southern guard for the Mississippi Aggies, leading them to the 1923 SoCon tournament title. He was also a center on the football team, and All-American in the discus. He later coached basketball at his alma mater, posting a 14–9 record. He was inducted into the Mississippi Sports Hall of Fame in 1966. He was 6'2" 200 pounds.

References

External links

1901 births
1972 deaths
American football centers
Basketball coaches from Illinois
Basketball coaches from Mississippi
Basketball players from Illinois
Basketball players from Mississippi
American male discus throwers
Guards (basketball)
Mississippi State Bulldogs football players
Mississippi State Bulldogs men's basketball coaches
Mississippi State Bulldogs men's basketball players
Ole Miss Rebels men's basketball coaches
People from Clinton, Illinois
People from Moorhead, Mississippi
Track and field athletes from Illinois